Robert Henry Clarence (6 September 1872 – 6 January 1908)  also known as Robert II was the King of the Miskito Nation. He was born at the Public General Hospital in Kingston, Jamaica. He was the last hereditary chief of the Miskito in 1890–1894 and briefly during July to August 1894.

Clarence succeeded to the chiefdom on the death of his cousin Jonathan Charles Frederick, Hereditary Chief of the Miskito, in July 1890. After his downfall, he was rescued by a British warship that took him into exile together with 200 refugees to Puerto Limon, Costa Rica, and later to Jamaica. He was granted a pension by the British government of £1,785 per annum, and remained head of the "royal house" in name until his death.

Clarence died after an operation at the Public General Hospital in Kingston, Jamaica on 6 January 1908. He was married once to Irene Morrison, with whom he had two children, one of which was the "princess" Mary Clarence. He was succeeded as head of the royal house by his cousin Robert Frederick.

Ancestry

See also
Miskito people#History

References

Miskito people
1872 births
1908 deaths